Abdullah (Abdu) Saedi (24 August 1942 – 1973) was an Iranian footballer. He competed in the men's tournament at the 1964 Summer Olympics.

References

External links
 

1942 births
1973 deaths
Iranian footballers
Iran international footballers
Olympic footballers of Iran
Footballers at the 1964 Summer Olympics
1968 AFC Asian Cup players
Association football midfielders